Orchard Park High School (formerly Edenham High School) is an 11–18 mixed, secondary school and sixth form with academy status in Shirley, Croydon, Greater London, England. It was formerly a foundation school and became an academy in September 2015. It adopted its present name in September 2017 and is part of the Greenshaw Learning Trust.

History 
Orchard Park High School was formerly a foundation school known as Edenham High School. It was Croydon's last remaining local authority secondary school, until it became an academy as part of the Greenshaw Learning Trust in September 2015. It changed its name to Orchard Park High School with a new badge and uniform in September 2017. The changes represent its location in the Monks Orchard community and the heritage of the school site, with elements of the previous landowners family crests used.

Notable alumni 
Edenham High School
 Ben Haenow, singer
 Joshua Buatsi, professional boxer
 Feroz Abbasi, former Guantanamo Bay detainee

Notable staff 
 Gavin McGowan, former PE teacher

References

External links 
 

Secondary schools in the London Borough of Croydon
Academies in the London Borough of Croydon